Aberlour House may refer to:

 Aberlour House (building), a country house in Moray
 Aberlour House (school), a preparatory school associated with Gordonstoun